Christian and Joseph Cousins (born March 17, 1983) are American actors who are identical twins. As with many cases of child actors who are twins, the roles they played were usually shared between the two. Their most famous role was as Dominic in the 1990 film Kindergarten Cop alongside Arnold Schwarzenegger.

Christian and Joseph's first role was playing Val and Gary Ewing's son Bobby Ewing on the soap opera Knots Landing, beginning in 1987.  The character was named after Bobby Ewing who died during the dream season on Dallas. Afterwards, they frequently appeared in various television series and films, including Twin Sitters and Critters 3, as well as episodes of Father Dowling Mysteries, Eerie, Indiana, and Wings.

References

External links

1983 births
Living people
American male film actors
American male identical twin child actors